Appoquinimink Friends Meetinghouse, also known as the Odessa Friends Meetinghouse, is a very small but historic Quaker meetinghouse on Main Street in Odessa, Delaware. It was built in 1785 by David Wilson and added to the National Register of Historic Places in 1972. Members of the meeting, including John Hunn and his cousin John Alston, were active in the Underground Railroad and Harriet Tubman may have hid in the meetinghouse.

History
Quakers were some of the earliest settlers in the Odessa area, but the first meetinghouse was not established until 1763 when Friends in Georges Creek applied to the Kennett Monthly Meeting to form a preparative (subsidiary) meeting.  They later affiliated with the Duck Creek Monthly Meeting in Smyrna, Delaware and in 1781 applied to move the meeting place to Appoquinimink Bridge (also called Cantwell's Bridge and now called Odessa).

A Quaker school, however, was established in Appoquinimink in 1735 and continued until the late 1800s.  The school building was later used as a parsonage by the Zoar Methodist Episcopal Church and then demolished.  The adjacent Methodist church was built in 1885 on land sold to it by the Quakers.

David Wilson built the present meetinghouse about 1785, but the building and grounds were not deeded to the Meeting until 1800.  Wilson and his wife, Mary Corbit, were not married at a Quaker meeting, but rather by a minister, so they were temporarily banned or "read out of the meeting."
In 1828 the Orthodox-Hicksite schism greatly reduced the membership of the Appoquinimink Meeting. The locally prominent Corbit family and several other members began attending the Orthodox meetinghouse in Wilmington, but the Duck Creek Monthly Meeting became Hicksite and owned the property.

The Alston family, including John Hunn, continued to support the Appoquinimink Meeting.  The Meeting became a station on the Underground Railroad and Hunn, along with Thomas Garrett was arrested, then severely fined, for helping fugitive slaves.  The meetinghouse's basement and second 
story, which has a removable panel under the eaves, may have been used to hide escaping slaves.

In the early 1870s John Alston was the only active member of the meeting.  After he died in 1874, the meetinghouse deteriorated.  Some of the rancor from the Orthodox-Hicksite schism may have survived however. The graves of Corbit family members were removed from the Hicksite property in 1900 and reburied in a private plot separated by a brick wall from the burial ground of the meetinghouse.  This plot was given to the Wilmington Monthly Meeting in 1970.

The building was restored in 1938, opened for worship in 1939, and in 1948 an Appoquinimink congregation was formed and given title to the property, which had devolved to the State of Delaware. The meeting continues to operate on a regular basis, meeting twice a month (first and third Sundays), as a preparative meeting under the care of the Wilmington Monthly Meeting.

See also
 List of Underground Railroad sites

References

External links
 Odessa Friends Meetinghouse, Route 299, Odessa, New Castle County, DE: 1 photo and 2 data pages at Historic American Buildings Survey
 

African-American history of Delaware
Quaker meeting houses in Delaware
Churches completed in 1785
18th-century Quaker meeting houses
Churches in New Castle County, Delaware
Churches on the National Register of Historic Places in Delaware
Churches on the Underground Railroad
National Register of Historic Places in New Castle County, Delaware
Individually listed contributing properties to historic districts on the National Register in Delaware
Cemeteries on the National Register of Historic Places in Delaware